David Steindl-Rast OSB (born July 12, 1926) is an American Catholic Benedictine monk, author, and lecturer. He is committed to interfaith dialogue and has dealt with the interaction between spirituality and science.

Life and career
Steindl-Rast was born and raised in Vienna, Austria, with a traditional Catholic upbringing that instilled in him a trust in life and an experience of mystery. His family and surname derive from their aristocratic seat near the pilgrimage site of Maria Rast, today Ruše in Slovenia. Privations he experienced in youth during the Second World War were magnified by the tensions of him being one-fourth Jewish. He was recruited into the German army but did not see combat. He received his MA degree from the Vienna Academy of Fine Arts and his PhD in experimental psychology from the University of Vienna (1952). He emigrated with his family to the United States in the same year and became a Benedictine monk in 1953 at Mount Saviour Monastery in Pine City, New York, a newly founded Benedictine community. With permission of his abbot, Damasus Winzen, in 1966 he was officially delegated to pursue Buddhist-Christian dialogue and began to study Zen with masters Haku'un Yasutani, Soen Nakagawa, Shunryu Suzuki, and Eido Tai Shimano.

As a Benedictine monk, he spent time in various monastic communities, including 14 years at the New Camaldoli Hermitage in Big Sur, California. He spent half the year as a hermit in a monastery and spent the other half lecturing and giving workshops and retreats. His experience around the world and with the world's various religions convinced him that the human response of gratitude is a part of the religious worldview and is essential to all human life.

He co-founded the Center for Spiritual Studies with Jewish, Buddhist, Hindu and Sufi teachers in 1968, and since the 1970s has been a member of the cultural historian William Irwin Thompson's Lindisfarne Association. He received the Martin Buber Award for his achievements in building dialog among religious traditions. His writings include Gratefulness, the Heart of Prayer, The Music of Silence (with Sharon Lebell), Words of Common Sense and Belonging to the Universe (co-authored with Fritjof Capra). In 2000, he co-founded A Network for Grateful Living, an organization dedicated to gratefulness as a transformative influence for individuals and society.

Religion and mysticism

During Link TV's Lunch With Bokara 2005 episode "The Monk and the Rabbi", he stated:

In that same episode, he expressed his belief in panentheism, where divinity interpenetrates every part of existence and timelessly extends beyond it (as distinct from pantheism).

Selected writings
 1984, Gratefulness, the Heart of Prayer: An Approach to Life in Fullness, N.J. Paulist Press 1984. 
 1991, Belonging to the Universe: Explorations on the Frontiers of Science and Spirituality, coauthored with Fritjof Capra and Thomas Matus, Harper San Francisco, 
 1995, Music of Silence: A Sacred Journey through the Hours of the Day, coauthored with Sharon LeBell, Ulysses Press, 2. Ed. 2001, 
 1996, The Ground We Share: Everyday Practice, Buddhist and Christian, coauthored with Robert Baker Aitken. Shambhala Publications, 
 1999, A Listening Heart: The Spirituality of Sacred Sensuousness, Crossroad, 
 2002, Words of Common Sense for Mind, Body and Soul, Templeton Foundation Press, 
 2008, Common Sense Spirituality. The Crossroad Publishing Company, 
 2010, Deeper than Words: Living the Apostles' Creed, Doubleday Religion, 
 2010, David Steindl-Rast:  Essential Writings, selected with and introduction by Clare Hallward, (Modern Spiritual Masters series, edited by Robert Ellsberg), Orbis Books, 
 2016, Faith beyond Belief: Spirituality for Our Times, coauthored with Anselm Grün. Liturgical Press, 
 2016. The Way of Silence: Engaging the Sacred in Daily Life, Franciscan Media, 
 2017, i am through you so i, Paulist Press, 
 2021, 99 Names of God, Orbis Books, 

In addition he has contributed to numerous works, including:
 Introduction, Words of Gratitude for Mind, Body, and Soul, by Robert A. Emmons and Joanna Hill
 Afterword, Benedict's Dharma: Buddhists Reflect on the Rule of Saint Benedict, by Norman Fischer, Joseph Goldstein and Judith Simmer-Brown, edited by Yifa, and Patrick Henry
 Foreword, Living Buddha, Living Christ, by Thich Nhat Hanh
 Foreword, This World, by Teddy Macker
 Chapter in Entheogens and the Future of Religion titled "Explorations into God", edited by Robert Forte

Further reading
 Henry, Patrick et al., Benedict's Dharma: Buddhist Reflect on the Rule of Saint Benedict, Riverhead Books, New York, NY, pp. 222.
 Lafevere, Patricia, "Spirituality of gratefulness begins with existential ‘Wow!’ at God's giving," National Catholic Reporter, December 8, 2000

References

External links 
 Steindl-Rast's website
 Video-interview on practice of now-ness, science-religion dialogue and Heidegger's thrownness
 Interview on a public radio show, Humankind, by David Freudberg
 Several articles by Steindl-Rast and others.
 Network for Grateful Living Web page
Interview transcript and audio from "On Being with Krista Tippett," 2016
 
 "Want to be happy? Be grateful" (TEDGlobal 2013)

1926 births
Living people
20th-century American Roman Catholic theologians
21st-century American Roman Catholic theologians
Academy of Fine Arts Vienna alumni
American Benedictines
Austria–Japan relations
Austrian Benedictines
Austrian emigrants to the United States
Buddhist and Christian interfaith dialogue
Catholic ecumenical and interfaith relations
Catholics from New York (state)
People from Chemung County, New York
People in interfaith dialogue
University of Vienna alumni
Writers from Vienna